Joseph E. Jones (June 29, 1914 – May 8, 2003) was an American Democratic legislator.

Born in Antigo, Wisconsin, Jones went to Bowlby Business College, University of Wisconsin–Madison, Northwest University for Machinist Business College, and was a machinist. He served in the United States Army during World War II and the Korean War. He served in the Wisconsin State Assembly 1963-1971 from Milwaukee, Wisconsin. In 1977, Jones was elected sergeant at arms of the Wisconsin State Assembly. In 1990, Jones served on the Langlade County, Wisconsin Board of Supervisors. He died in Pearson, Wisconsin.

Notes

People from Antigo, Wisconsin
Politicians from Milwaukee
University of Wisconsin–Madison alumni
County supervisors in Wisconsin
Employees of the Wisconsin Legislature
1914 births
2003 deaths
20th-century American politicians
Democratic Party members of the Wisconsin State Assembly